Roseneath is a suburb of Wellington, New Zealand, located east of Oriental Bay and north of Hataitai. The peninsula was named after Rosneath, a village on the Rosneath peninsula on Scotland's River Clyde, and has no association with roses.

History 
David Wilkinson from Ayrshire, Scotland, was an early Wellington resident and gardener who lived at Oriental Bay in a house named Roseneath Cottage in the 1850s. He operated a tea garden and plant nursery here too, until at least 1891. The Roseneath Estate began to be developed in 1886 and possibly took its name from Wilkinson's business. Sections covering an area from Point Jerningham to Grafton Road down to Evans Bay were released for sale in 1888 and another block covering an area from Grafton Road up the hillside was for sale in 1902. Walking access from Oriental Bay to Roseneath begins at the top of Grass Street outside Wilkinson's house, now 13 Grass Street and on a terrace at the foot of Wilkinson Street.

St Barnabas Anglican church on Maida Vale Rd was dedicated on 19 November 1899. In January 1924 there was a serious fire in the wooden church, but it was rebuilt.

Gateways Apartments at 19 Maida Vale Rd, next to the church and school, is a large modernist block of 60 flats built in the 1960s.

The headland forming the northern part of Roseneath is called Point Jerningham. A concrete lighthouse was installed in the water off the point in January 1929, replacing an earlier floating light. The lighthouse was transported to the site and lowered into position by the floating crane Hikitia. In 2019 a solar LED beacon was installed in the lighthouse. 

Point Jerningham is also the site of New Zealand's only permanent saluting battery, which began operating in 1918.  The New Zealand Army fires four 25-pound guns on special occasions, for example a 21-gun salute for the birthday of Queen Elizabeth II. 

Next to the saluting battery is the Long Hall. This building was originally a military barracks situated at Mt Victoria during World War 2. In 1947 members of the RSA moved it to its current site and used it as a clubrooms. After 1969 the hall was used as a practice space for Wellington Scottish Pipes and Drums and other uses. In 2008 a trust was formed to restore the building which had become dilapidated.

War Memorial 

The war memorial at the local school commemorates former pupils who died in World War I.

The memorial was unveiled by the Governor-General, the Earl of Liverpool, on 10 November 1917, almost exactly one year before the war was over.

At the time of unveiling, which was attended by the Mayor of Wellington, John Luke and the Prime Minister, William Massey, the memorial included the names of five soldiers killed in battle. By the end of the war, there were 13 names on the memorial.

Demographics 

Roseneath had a population of 1,788 at the 2018 New Zealand census, an increase of 57 people (3.3%) since the 2013 census, and an increase of 96 people (5.7%) since the 2006 census. There were 747 households. There were 873 males and 912 females, giving a sex ratio of 0.96 males per female. The median age was 38.8 years (compared with 37.4 years nationally), with 192 people (10.7%) aged under 15 years, 438 (24.5%) aged 15 to 29, 885 (49.5%) aged 30 to 64, and 273 (15.3%) aged 65 or older.

Ethnicities were 88.9% European/Pākehā, 4.9% Māori, 1.0% Pacific peoples, 7.7% Asian, and 4.4% other ethnicities (totals add to more than 100% since people could identify with multiple ethnicities).

The proportion of people born overseas was 34.6%, compared with 27.1% nationally.

Although some people objected to giving their religion, 58.7% had no religion, 28.5% were Christian, 1.2% were Hindu, 0.8% were Muslim, 1.2% were Buddhist and 5.0% had other religions.

Of those at least 15 years old, 954 (59.8%) people had a bachelor or higher degree, and 39 (2.4%) people had no formal qualifications. The median income was $58,200, compared with $31,800 nationally. The employment status of those at least 15 was that 1,023 (64.1%) people were employed full-time, 213 (13.3%) were part-time, and 33 (2.1%) were unemployed.

Education

Roseneath School is a co-educational state primary school for Year 1 to 8 students. It opened in 1898 because Clyde Quay School had become overcrowded.

References

Suburbs of Wellington City
Populated places around the Wellington Harbour